Bucky O'Hare is a fictional character and the hero of an eponymous comic book series and spin-off media, including an animated TV series and various toys and video games. He was created by comic book writer Larry Hama and comic book artist Michael Golden between 1977 and 1978 and made its publishing debut in Echo of Futurepast #1 in May 1984 Continuity Comics.

The storyline of Bucky O'Hare follows a parallel universe where a war is ongoing between the inept United Animals Federation and the sinister Toad Empire. The United Animals Federation is an interplanetary republic run by sapient mammals, while The Toad Empire is controlled by a vast computer system known as KOMPLEX, which has led the highly consumerist toad population to fight an expansionist campaign against the rest of the galaxy.

Overview
The original Bucky O'Hare was published by Continuity Comics between 1984 and 1985. The series ran in issues #1-6 of the comics anthology series Echo of Futurepast, with Hama writing and Michael Golden on pencils. All six parts were collected into an oversized graphic novel in 1986.

The comic book spawned an animated television adaptation, Bucky O'Hare and the Toad Wars, and in 1991, to coincide with its release, the original comic was re-published as its own standalone series, in an expanded form that modified and added to the original artwork, inserting many new panels and scenes into the story. The series was intended to run for six issues, but only five were published between January 1991 and March 1992, leaving the expanded version of the story incomplete. Hama wrote a second Bucky O'Hare arc, which was never published.

When the animated series was broadcast in the United Kingdom in 1992, DC Thomson published their own Bucky O'Hare comic, which ran bi-weekly for twenty issues from March to December of that year. The first six issues of the series re-printed the original US series (#1-5 using the expanded version, and #6 using the original Echo version), after which the series moved on to original material (incorporating elements of the animated series) written by Peter Stone, penciled by Andre Coates, and inked by Joel Adams.

The cartoon, meanwhile, ran from September 1991 to January 1992, along with a series of action figures. During that period, Konami produced two tie-in video games based on the property: an NES version and an arcade version, both released in 1992.

Characters

Bucky and his crew are members of the S.P.A.C.E. organization, which stands for Sentient Protoplasm Against Colonial Encroachment.
Bucky O'Hare – a green hare, captain of a S.P.A.C.E. frigate named The Righteous Indignation. His crew was introduced in the comic and consists of:
Jenny – first mate and pilot, a female cat from the planet Aldebaran with mysterious magical and psionic powers common to the females of her species. They include telepathy, astral projection, energy blasts, and healing. Because of the Prime Directive of the Aldebaran Sisterhood, she keeps these powers secret from the other members of the crew. She shows overt romantic affections for Willy DuWitt, as if she has a crush on him.
Bruiser – a Betelgeusian Berserker Baboon who served as the Righteous Indignation's engineer. In the TV show, he vanishes into another dimension when the ship's photon accelerator malfunctioned during battle.
Willy DuWitt – engineer, a pre-teen human genius from San Francisco who enters the parallel universe via a portal between the ship's photon accelerator and his own accelerator at home. He replaced Bruce, the former engineer, who was vaporized when toad plasma weapons caused a massive feedback in the ship's photon accelerator. Later, Willy became stranded when his parents turned off the photon accelerator back in his room. Bucky and his crew decide to keep Willy a secret from the Toads. 
Deadeye Duck – gunner, a four-armed former space pirate duck from Kanopis III. He is missing an eye, and is impatient and violent, preferring to let his four laser pistols do the talking for him. He speaks with a Southern accent.
AFC Blinky – an advanced AFC ("Android" First Class). It has only one eye and uses the phrase "Calamity and woe!" to identify problem situations for Bucky and his crew-mates.

The members of the Toad Empire introduced in the comic are as follows:
KOMPLEX – the undisputed ruler of the Toad Empire. This sapient computer program was designed to run the consumerist toad culture, and it did, by conquering it and militarizing it. Its name, in toad language, is an anagram for 'Feed me'.
Toad Air Marshall – one of KOMPLEX's foremost commanders, with a uniform adorned with medals and a face covered in warts.
Toad Borg – one of KOMPLEX's elite troops, part toad, part robot.
Storm Toads – the indoctrinated soldiers who serve as the primary attack force for the Empire.

In the comic, Bucky and crew escape a toad attack but must rescue Jenny when she is captured by the toads. In the end, a strange, nigh-omnipotent mouse banishes the toads attacking Bucky to "a safe place where the food is bad and taxes are high". Willy's parents, not knowing what the photon accelerator does, deactivate it, trapping him in the parallel universe.

The U.S. comic only ran this one plotline; however, to coincide with the TV series in the early '90s, a UK comic reprinted the issues, then produced a further fifteen issues written by Peter Stone, and illustrated by Andre Coates and Joel Adams.

In 2007, Vanguard reprinted the original Bucky O'Hare comic and two of the UK issues in a digest size collection, similar to a manga. The book is called Bucky O'Hare and the Toad Menace and is printed in black and white. The deluxe edition was also released. Some copies of the "deluxe" edition, however, were in fact the standard edition with a slipcover, not the signed, numbered color version that was advertised.

In other media
Bucky O'Hare and the Toad Wars! was a syndicated animated television network show which aired in 1991.

Video games

A Bucky O'Hare game was released for the Nintendo Entertainment System in 1992, which required Bucky to rescue each of his crew members (except Bruiser, who is not featured in the game) on a series of planets. As each character was rescued, the player gained the ability to switch between them and Bucky on the fly to deal with different problems.  Immediately after regaining his entire crew, they are once again captured and imprisoned on the Toad mother ship. Bucky and Blinky, sharing the same cell, break out and must rescue the remaining members. Afterwards, they continue through the monstrous ship. The gameplay and level design very closely resemble that of Capcom's Mega Man series with elements from Konami's Contra series and character switching from Konami's Teenage Mutant Ninja Turtles mixed in.

An arcade game by Konami was also released which allowed up to four players to control Bucky, Jenny, Deadeye or Blinky. It is a run-n-gun game similar to the Konami arcade games Sunset Riders, Mystic Warriors, Wild West C.O.W.-Boys of Moo Mesa, and Aliens. The plot of the arcade game allowed players to achieve final victory over the toads by releasing an energy called the Interplanetary Life Force contained within KOMPLEX. The game also featured the original voice cast.

Konami also released a Bucky O'Hare handheld electronic game.

Toy line
In 1991, the toy company Hasbro released a line of action figures based closely on the Bucky O'Hare series. Most of the major characters were represented: Bucky O'Hare, Deadeye Duck, Willy DuWitt, Blinky, Bruiser and Commander Dogstar were the heroes released, and Toadborg, Air Marshall, Storm Toad Trooper and Al Negator were the villains that made it to the shelves. Two vehicles were released as well. The good guy vehicle was the Toad Croaker. The bad guy vehicle was the Toad Double Bubble.

The line was terminated before the next two series of action figures could be finished. There are several photographs available online of the unreleased figures, some completely painted with accessories, and others as unpainted prototypes. At least one photo shows the fully packaged Jenny, likely because this figure was completed in time for the first release, but was delayed to be part of the second. Several others show Pitstop Pete and Sly Leezard both as unpainted and as completed figures. Bucky in a spacesuit, Rumble Bee, Kamikaze Kamo and Total Terror Toad are the other finished figures. The mobile configuration of the chief villain Komplex (Komplex-2-Go in the arcade game), Digger, and Tri-Bot (a minor villain from the final episode) are the other unpainted prototypes known to exist from these photos. More recently, both an unpainted prototype and a fully finalized figure of Jenny was revealed online in a review video.

In 2017, Boss Fight Studios began to release new Bucky O'Hare action figures. These updated moulds feature multiple points of articulation and interchangeable hands and faces. The first two to be released were Bucky O'Hare and the much anticipated First Mate Jenny.
Later releases included Stealth Mission Bucky, Astral Projection Jenny, Deadeye Duck, and the Storm Toad Trooper. Two promotional figures were also released; an Easter themed Bucky (moulded in chocolate themed colours) and a Corsair Canard Deadeye Duck who was packaged in a promotional steel lunch-box featuring Bucky O'Hare concept art.
The line now has seen the introduction of Bruiser who is listed as a deluxe figure, and comes packaged in a window-box with Bruiser artwork and bio. Bringing a total of five figure moulds produced and nine figure variants released.
The final two releases were a new figure mould of Mimi Lafleur, and an Aniverse colour variant of the Storm Toad. 
After that, Boss Fight Studio lost the license to produce any further figures, due to Continuity Comics having lost interest in the line.

Legacy
During the 1990s, VHS tapes were released by Family Home Entertainment. Due to Sunbow Productions' lack of a US home distributor currently (it was formerly Rhino, then Sony Wonder, which has shut down), the cartoon had been stalled in releasing a Region 1 DVD. A company called Exposure Entertainment was supposed to have released the 13 episodes on DVD in North America, in Region 1 NTSC format for the first time, but the overall release was either very rare and limited, or no set had appeared at all. The same company had a similar issue with their first season release of Biker Mice from Mars. Hasbro has recently acquired the rights to most of their cartoon library, and since the toys were produced by Hasbro, it may be possible for the series to see a DVD release in Region 1 eventually, if Hasbro did acquire the rights to the cartoon and if they can find a distributor for the show.

Comic book artist Neal Adams and Continuity created a short online 3-D cartoon of Bucky O'Hare.

In 2006, Neal Adams was reportedly working on a Bucky O'Hare movie project. No updates were provided and the project is presumably cancelled.

The graphic novel Neal Adams Presents Bucky O'Hare and the Toad Menace was re-released in 2008 in manga format by Vanguard Press.

References

External links

Neal Adams and Continuity Studios
Don Markstein's Toonopedia: Bucky O'Hare

 
1990s toys
Action figures
O'Hare, Bucky
Anthropomorphic video game characters
O'Hare, Bucky
O'Hare, Bucky
O'Hare, Bucky
Comics adapted into animated series
Comics adapted into video games
O'Hare, Bucky
Comics about rabbits and hares
Comics about animals
Continuity Comics titles
O'Hare, Bucky
O'Hare, Bucky
O'Hare, Bucky
Handheld electronic games
O'Hare, Bucky

ru:Bucky O’Hare